Moromycins are anticancer antibiotics of the angucycline class.

References 

Antibiotics
Angucyclines